William Wake (1657–1737) was an English priest and the archbishop of Canterbury 1716 until his death in 1737.

William Wake may also refer to:
Sir William Wake, 8th Baronet (1742–1785), British politician
William Wake (cricketer) (1852–1896), English cricketer
William Wake (governor), governor of Bombay, 1742–1750
William Wake (sailor), captain of the British trading schooner, Prince William Henry, Wake Island is named after him